North Coast Line (NCL) opening dates chronologicallyQuinlan, H. & Newland, R. 'Australian Railway Routes 1854-2000' ARHS NSW 2000

This is a list of the NCL opening dates in chronological order. This list shows the known opening dates for all line construction, including deviations, plus the known dates of other significant NCL related events. A list of the NCL opening dates by section is here.

20 Dec 1880 Townsville-Stuart opens
6 Aug 1881 Maryborough-Gympie opens
11 May 1882 Roma Street-Sandgate (via Normanby) opens
30 Mar 1883 Baddow-Howard opens
1 April 1886 First section of duplicated track in Queensland, Albion-Eagle Junction, opens
22 Dec 1886 Mayne-Albion duplication opened
15 Aug 1887 Howard-Goodwood opens
20 Feb 1888 Goodwood-Bundaberg opens, links Bundaberg to Maryborough and Gympie
11 June 1888 Petrie-Caboolture opens
10 June 1889 Gympie-Cooran opens
18 Aug 1889 Roma Street-Central opens, first section in Queensland constructed as dual track
1 Feb 1890 Caboolture-Landsborough opens
1 May 1890 Bowen-Guthalungra opens, creating the 11th isolated system
17 Aug 1890 Eagle Junction-Northgate duplication opens
1 Nov 1890 Central-Mayne opens as dual track, completing the 'City Railway'
1 Jan 1891 Landsborough-Yandina opens
1 April 1891 Cooran-Cooroy opens
15 June 1891 Bundaberg-North Bundaberg, over Burnett River opens, links Mount Perry line to North Coast line
17 July 1891 Yandina-Cooroy opens, links Bundaberg, Maryborough and Gympie to Brisbane, Chrleville and Wallangarra
1 Oct 1891 Guthalungra-Bobawaba opens
1 July 1892 North Bundaberg-Rosedale opens
1 Aug 1896 Gladstone-Iveragh opens
1 Oct 1897 Rosedale-Iveragh opens, links Gladstone to Bundaberg and Brisbane
1897 Cairns-Gordonvale opens as Cairns Shire Tramway
1898 Steamer service between Gladstone-Rockhampton and Gladstone-Mackay-Townsville commenced
6 Nov 1899 Rockhampton-North Rockhampton over Fitzroy River opens as dual track, links Emu Park and Broadmount to Rockhampton and Longreach
1901 Stuart-Ayr tramway opened by Ayr Tramway Joint Board (ATJB)
1903 Bowen-Bobawaba line closed as public railway, leased to Bowen abattoir
18 Dec 1903 Gladstone-Rockhampton opens, links Longreach, Springsure and Clermont to Brisbane and beyond
1904 QR resumes operation of Bowen-Bobawaba line as a public railway
1910 Gordonvale-Babinda tramway opens
1910 Don (Bowen)-Proserpine tramway opened by Bowen Proserpine Joint Tramway Board (BPJTB)
1 Jan 1911 Stuart-Ayr Tramway purchased from ATJB by Queensland Railways
1 July 1911 Cairns-Babinda Tramway purchased from Cairns Shire Council by Queensland Railways
18 Oct 1911 Glenmore Junction (North Rockhampton)-Milman opens
9 Dec 1912 Babinda-Pawngilly opens
30 June 1913 Ayr-Carstairs opens
1 July 1913 Paget-Sarina opens
3 July 1913 Bobawaba-Home Hill opens
1 Sept 1913 Home Hill-Carstairs, including low level Burdekin Bridge opens, links Bowen to Townsville
1 Oct 1913 Milman-Yaamba opens
14 April 1914 Townsville-Kurukan opens
5 April 1915 Kurukan-Rollingstone opens
20 July 1915 Sarina-Koumala opens
3 Aug 1915 Yaamba-Kunwarara opens
1917 Duplication to Caboolture completed
31 March 1917 Kunwarara-Marlborough opens
2 May 1917 Rollingstone-Moongobulla opens
1 July 1917 Don-Proserpine purchased from BPJTB by Queensland Railways
19 April 1918 Mackay-Farleigh opens
29 July 1918 Moongobulla-Coolbie opens
26 Dec 1918 Coolbie-Bambaroo opens
5 June 1919 Marlborough-Styx opens
21 July 1919 Bambaroo-Toobanna opens
13 Sept 1919 Daradgee-Pawngilly opens
1 Dec 1919 Toobana-Ingham opens
9 August 1920 Styx-Wumalgi opens
10 Aug 1920 Koumala-Carmila opens
10 Jan 1921 Ingham-Lily Pond opens
4 June 1921 Wumalgi-St Lawrence opens
24 Sept 1921 St Lawrence-Carmila opens, linking Mackay to Rockhampton and beyond
1 March 1922 Gargett-Pakula opened
28 Aug 1922 Pakula-Owens Creek opened
18 Dec 1922 Innisfail-El Arish opens
1 Dec 1923 Farleigh-Proserpine opens, linking Townsville and Ingham with Mackay and beyond
3 Dec 1923 El Arish-Feluga opens
10 Dec 1924 Lily Pond-Feluga, Innisfail-Daradgee opens, linking Cairns to Townsville and rest of Queensland Railways system
1936 Townsville-Stuart duplication opens
1957 Burdekin High level bridge opens
1963 Stuart-Nome duplication opens
17 Nov 1979 Roma Street-Bowen Hills (via Central) section electrified
1979 Brunswick Street-Northgate third line completed
24 Nov 1980 Midgee-Rocklands-Gracemere opens
3 March 1982 Roma Street-Bowen Hills (via Normanby) section electrified
18 Sep 1982 Bowen Hills-Northgate electrified
23 April 1983 Northgate-Petrie electrified
26 May 1986 Rocklands-Port Curtis Junction opens, Gracemere-Port Curtis Junction and Midgee-Port Curtis Junction sections closed
28 June 1986 Petrie-Caboolture electrified
6 Sept 1986 Gladstone-Rockhampton electrification commissioned
28 April 1988 Caboolture-Nambour electrification commissioned
23 May 1988 Maryborough bypass opens
9 Dec 1988 Gympie bypass opens
4 Feb 1989 Nambour-Gympie North electrification commissioned
1989 Gympie North-Gladstone electrification commissioned
2 May 1993 Mackay realignment opens
1 Sep 1993 Bowen realignment opens
1995 Gladstone-Rocklands duplication completed
2009 Caboolture-Beerburrum duplicated

References

North Coast railway line, Queensland